Rafael Nadal was the defending champion, but chose not to participate this year.

Martin Kližan won the title, defeating Pablo Cuevas in the final, 6–1, 6–4.

Seeds

Draw

Finals

Top half

Bottom half

Qualifying

Seeds

Qualifiers

Qualifying draw

First qualifier

Second qualifier

Third qualifier

Fourth qualifier

References
Main Draw
Qualifying Draw

Singles